Cirricaecula is a genus of eels in the snake eel family Ophichthidae.

Species
There are currently two recognized species in this genus:

 Cirricaecula johnsoni L. P. Schultz, 1953 (Fringelip snake-eel)
 Cirricaecula macdowelli McCosker & J. E. Randall, 1993

References

Ophichthidae
Taxa named by Leonard Peter Schultz